Missing Links Volume Two is a compilation album of rare and previously unreleased songs by the Monkees, issued by Rhino Records in 1990. It is the second volume of a three-volume set, preceded by Missing Links in 1987 and followed by Missing Links Volume Three in 1996.

While several of the tracks had been featured in the Monkees' television series, only one of the tracks had ever been issued commercially: the live version of "Circle Sky" had appeared in the Monkees' feature film Head and was previously released on the Australian compilation Monkeemania (40 Timeless Hits) in 1979.This compilation contains one mislabeled track, as "Down the Highway" is mistitled "Michigan Blackhawk."

As this compilation was released on both cassette and CD, tracks 7, 11, 14 and 15 do not appear on the original cassette version. A vinyl version was released in 2021 from Friday Music for Record Store Day.

Track listing

Session information

"All the King's Horses"
Written by Michael Nesmith
Lead vocal: Micky Dolenz
Harmony vocals: Michael Nesmith
Backing vocals: Micky Dolenz, Davy Jones, Michael Nesmith, Peter Tork
Guitar: James Burton, Glen Campbell, Al Casey
Bass: Larry Knechtel, Bob West
Drums: Hal Blaine
Percussion: Gary Coleman, Jim Gordon
Recorded at RCA Victor Studios, Hollywood, California, June 25 (7:30 pm–12:15 am), July 16, 1966 (during sessions for The Monkees)Produced by Michael Nesmith

"Valleri" (first recorded version)
Written by Tommy Boyce and Bobby Hart
Lead vocal: Davy Jones
Backing vocals: Micky Dolenz, Tommy Boyce, Wayne Erwin, Bobby Hart, Ron Hicklin
Guitar: Wayne Erwin, Gerry McGee, Louie Shelton
Bass: Larry Taylor
Drums: Billy Lewis
Tambourine: Gene Estes
Produced by Tommy Boyce and Bobby Hart
Recorded at RCA Victor Studio A, Hollywood, California, August 6 (7:30 P.M. - 10:30 P.M.), August 27 (3:30 P.M. start), 1966, during sessions for More of the Monkees. It was later re-cut for The Birds, The Bees & The Monkees.

"St. Matthew"
Written by Michael Nesmith
Lead vocal: Michael Nesmith
Electric guitar: Michael Nesmith
Guitar: Harold Bradley, Wayne Moss 
Steel guitar: Lloyd Green
Bass: Norbert Putnam
Banjo: Bobby Thompson
Drums: Jerry Carrigan
Percussion/Organ: Unknown
Piano: David Briggs
Fiddle: Buddy Spicher
Produced by Michael Nesmith
Recorded at RCA Victor Studios, Nashville, Tennessee, June 2 (12:00 P.M. - 3:00 P.M.), June 12, August 5, 1968, during sessions for Head"Words" (first recorded version)
Written by Tommy Boyce and Bobby Hart
Lead vocals: Micky Dolenz, Peter Tork
Backing vocals: Micky Dolenz, Davy Jones, Peter Tork, Tommy Boyce, Wayne Erwin, Bobby Hart, Ron Hicklin
Guitar: Wayne Erwin, Gerry McGee, Louie Shelton
Bass: Larry Taylor
Drums: Billy Lewis
Percussion: Norm Jeffries
Flute: Ethmer Roten
Produced by Tommy Boyce and Bobby Hart
Recorded at RCA Victor Studios, Hollywood, August 15 (7:00 P.M. - 1:00 A.M.) and 27 (3:30 P.M. start), during sessions for More of the Monkees. It was later re-cut for Pisces, Aquarius, Capricorn & Jones Ltd.Includes a backwards tape segment not included in the episode of the TV series in which the track appeared ("Monkees Manhattan Style")

"Some of Shelly's Blues"
Written by Michael Nesmith
Lead vocal: Michael Nesmith
Acoustic guitar: Billy Sanford
Steel guitar: Lloyd Green
Banjo: Sonny Osborne
Bass: Bobby Dyson
Drums: Willie Ackerman
Organ: Larry Butler
Harmonica: Charlie McCoy
Produced by Michael Nesmith and Felton Jarvis
Recorded at RCA Victor Studios, Nashville, Tennessee, May 29 (6:00 P.M. - 9:00 P.M.), June 2 (10:30 P.M. - 1:30 A.M.), 1968, during sessions for Head"I Wanna Be Free" (fast version)
Written by Tommy Boyce and Bobby Hart
Lead vocals: Micky Dolenz, Davy Jones
Guitar: Wayne Erwin, Gerry McGee, Louie Shelton
Bass: Larry Taylor
Drums: Billy Lewis
Tambourine: Gene Estes
Organ: Michel Rubini
Produced by Tommy Boyce and Bobby Hart
Recorded at RCA Victor Studios, Hollywood, California, July 19, (2:00–6:00 PM, 7:00-10:00 PM) and 24 (11:00 AM-7:00 PM), 1966, during sessions for The Monkees"If I Ever Get to Saginaw Again"
Written by Jack Keller and Bob Russell
Lead vocal: Michael Nesmith
Guitar: Del Kacher?
Electric Guitar: Louie Shelton
Acoustic Guitar: Dennis Budimir, Al Casey, Mike Deasy
Bass: Max Bennett
Drums: Earl Palmer
Tambourine/Vibes: Milt Holland, Stan Levey
Harpsichord: Michael Melvoin
Violin: Jack Gootkin, Bob Jung, George Poole, Heimann Weinstine, William Weiss
Viola: Garry Nuttycombe 
Cello: Douglas Davis
Produced by Michael Nesmith and Don McGinnis
Recorded at RCA Victor Studios, Hollywood, California, March 9 (4:30 P.M. - 7:30 P.M., 8:30 P.M. - 11:30 P.M.), 1968, January 31 (2:00 P.M. - 5:00 P.M.), 1969, and at United Recorders, Hollywood, March 6 (2:30 P.M. - 5:30 P.M.) and 7, 1969

"Come on In"
Written by Jo Mapes
Lead vocal: Peter Tork
Electric guitar: Stephen Stills, Lance Wakely
Bass: Peter Tork
Drums: Dewey Martin
Tack piano: Peter Tork
Produced by Peter Tork
Recorded at Western Recorders, Hollywood, California, February 8 (9:00 A.M. - 1:30 P.M.), 9, 11-13, 1968, during sessions for The Birds, The Bees & The Monkees 
The liner notes mistakenly credit the song to Steven Duboff and Neil Levenson

"I'll Be Back Up on My Feet" (mono TV version)
Written by Sandy Linzer and Denny Randell
Lead vocal: Micky Dolenz
Backing vocal: Unknown
Guitars: Al Casey, Carol Kaye
Bass: Ray Pohlman
Drums: Hal Blaine
Percussion: Frank Capp, Julius Wechter
Piano: Don Randi and Michel Rubini
Produced by Jeff Barry
Recorded on October 28, 1966, during sessions for More of the Monkees. It was later re-cut for The Birds, The Bees & The Monkees.

"Down the Highway (aka Michigan Blackhawk)"
Written by Carole King and Toni Stern
Lead vocal: Michael Nesmith
Guitars: Al Casey, Louie Shelton
Bass: Max Bennett
Drums: Hal Blaine
Piano: Larry Knechtel
Produced by Michael Nesmith
Recorded in June 5 (2:00 P.M. - 5:00 P.M.), 1969  
Recorded at RCA Victor Studios, Hollywood, California; June 5, 1969, during sessions for The Monkees Present. Several sources erroneously claim the song was recorded in June 1968.
The actual title of this song is "Down the Highway". It was confused with an unrelated and unfinished Michael Nesmith song entitled "Michigan Blackhawk", recorded on June 10, 1969.

"Hold on Girl" (first recorded version)
Written by Jack Keller, Ben Raleigh, Billy Carr
Lead vocal: Davy Jones
Backing vocals: Micky Dolenz, Davy Jones, Tommy Boyce, Bobby Hart, Ron Hicklin
Guitar: Wayne Erwin, Gerry McGee, Louie Shelton
Bass: Larry Taylor
Drums: Billy Lewis
Percussion: Alan Estes
Oboe: Norman Benno
Harpsichord: Michel Rubini
Produced by Jeff Barry and Jack Keller
Recorded at RCA Victor Studios, Hollywood, California, September 10 and 24 (2:00 P.M. - 6:00 P.M., 7:00 P.M. - 12:00 A.M.), 1966, during sessions for More of the Monkees"The Crippled Lion"
Written by Michael Nesmith
Lead vocal: Michael Nesmith
Acoustic guitar: Harold Bradley
Steel guitar: Lloyd Green
Banjo: Sonny Osborne
Bass: Bobby Dyson
Drums: Jerry Carrigan
Organ: David Briggs
Produced by Michael Nesmith and Felton Jarvis
Recorded at RCA Victor Studios, Nashville, Tennessee, May 29 (10:00 A.M. - 1:00 P.M.), 1968, during sessions for Head"Changes"
Written by David Jones and Steve Pitts
Lead vocal: Davy Jones
Guitar: Mike Deasy, Al Hendrickson, Gerry McGee
Bass: Max Bennett
Drums: Earl Palmer
Percussion: Milt Holland, Jerry Williams
Piano: Don Randi
Violin: Sam Freed, Nathan Kaproff, George Kast, Marvin Limonick, Alex Murray, Erno Neufeld
Cello: Marie Fera, Jacqueline Lustgarten, Edgar Lustgarten, Frederick Seykora
Trumpet: Buddy Childers, Jack Sheldon
French Horn: John Cave, David Duke, Arthur Maebe
Trombone: George Roberts
Produced by The Monkees
Recorded at RCA Victor Studios, Hollywood, February 6 (2:00 P.M. - 5:00 P.M., 10:00 P.M. - 2:00 A.M.) and 8 (7:30 P.M. - 10:30 P.M.), 1968, during sessions for The Birds, The Bees & The Monkees"Mr. Webster" (first recorded version)
Written by Tommy Boyce and Bobby Hart
Lead/backing vocals: Micky Dolenz
Acoustic guitars: Wayne Erwin, Gerry McGee, Louie Shelton
Bass: Larry Taylor
Harpsichord: Michel Rubini  
Percussion: Alan Estes
Oboe: Norman Benno
Cello: Maggie Aue
Produced by Tommy Boyce and Bobby Hart
Recorded at RCA Victor Studios, Hollywood, California, September 10 and 24 (2:00 P.M. - 6:00 P.M., 7:00 P.M. - 12:00 A.M.), 1966, during sessions for More of the Monkees. It was later re-cut for Headquarters.

"You Just May Be The One" (first recorded version)
Written by Michael Nesmith
Lead vocals: Michael Nesmith
Backing vocals: Michael Nesmith and Unknown
Guitar/Dano bass: Peter Tork, James Burton, Glen Campbell, Al Casey, Mike Deasey
Bass: Bob West
Drums: Hal Blaine
Percussion: Gary Coleman, Frank DeVito
Piano: Larry Knechtel
Produced by Michael Nesmith
Recorded at RCA Victor Studios, Hollywood, California, July 18 (8:00 P.M.-12:00 A.M.) and 27, 1966 during sessions for The Monkees. It was later re-cut for Headquarters.
Featured doubling of regular bass with Danelectro bass. The doubling of bass proved difficult to master, as some 35 takes were needed before the backing track was completed.

"(I Prithee) Do Not Ask For Love" (first recorded version)
Written by Michael Martin Murphey
Lead vocal: Micky Dolenz
Guitar: Peter Tork, James Burton, Glen Campbell, Al Casey, Mike Deasey
Bass: Bob West
Drums: Hal Blaine
Percussion: Gary Coleman, Jim Gordon
Piano: Michael Cohen, Larry Knechtel
Produced by Michael Nesmith
Recorded at Western Recorders, Hollywood, on July 25 (8:00 P.M. - 12:15 A.M.) and at RCA Victor Studios on October 18 (4:00 P.M. - 12:00 A.M.), 1966, during sessions for The Monkees and More of the Monkees"Circle Sky" (live version)
 Written by Michael Nesmith
 Lead vocal: Michael Nesmith
 Electric guitar: Michael Nesmith
 Bass: Peter Tork
 Drums: Micky Dolenz
 Percussion/Organ: Davy Jones
 Produced by Michael Nesmith
 Recorded live at Valley Auditorium and Lagoon Park Amusement Center, Salt Lake City, Utah, May 17, 1968, with overdubbed vocals recorded at RCA Victor Studios from May 21, 1968. Performance featured in the film Head.

"Seeger's Theme" (fourth recorded version)
Written by Pete Seeger
Whistling: Peter Tork
Guitars: Peter Tork, Lance Wakely
Banjo/bass: Peter Tork
Drums: Buddy Miles
Produced by Peter Tork
Recorded at RCA Victor Studios, Hollywood, California, February 12 and 13, 1968, during sessions for The Birds, The Bees & The Monkees 
Originally recorded during sessions for Headquarters. First version released on The Headquarters Sessions.

"Riiu Chiu" (studio version)
Traditional
Lead vocal by Micky Dolenz
Harmony vocals: Michael Nesmith, Peter Tork, Chip Douglas
Produced by Chip Douglas
Recorded on October 3, 1967, during sessions for Pisces, Aquarius, Capricorn & Jones Ltd.'' 
Douglas substitutes for Davy Jones on harmony vocals

References

The Monkees compilation albums
1990 compilation albums
Rhino Records compilation albums